Anstice may refer to:

Surname
 John Henry Anstice (1897-?), British Army officer during the Second World War
 Joseph Anstice (1808–1836), Classical scholar and sometime a professor of classical literature in King's College London
 Mark Anstice (born 1967), Scottish explorer and adventurous documentary reality television film maker
 Robert Richard Anstice (1813–1853), English clergyman and mathematician

Given name
 Laurence Anstice Pavitt (1914–1989), a Labour and Co-operative Party politician in the UK

See also
 Anstis
 Anstiss